North Little Rock School District (NLRSD) is a public school district headquartered in North Little Rock, Arkansas, United States.

History

LRSD vs. PCSSD (desegregation) 
The three school districts within the county—Little Rock School District (LRSD), North Little Rock School District (NLRSD), and Pulaski County Special School District (PCSSD)—have been involved in a desegregation case that the courts determined were unconstitutionally segregated and placed under court supervision since 1982. After numerous actions were satisfied, including incorporating those schools within the City of Little Rock boundaries to be unitary with the LRSD, those actions led to the annexation of J. A. Fair High School from PCSSD to LRSD in 1987. In 2007, the courts determined that all actions by LRSD were completed and that court supervision continues until NLRSD and PCSSD actions are completed.

Schools

High school 
The district has one high school, North Little Rock High School, which has grades 9–12. 
In the school year(2016-2017) the North Little Rock School district opened a new facility for all students 9–12.

Middle schools 
North Little Rock Middle School

Elementary schools 
 Amboy
 Boone Park
 Crestwood
 Glenview
 Indian Hills
 Lakewood
 Meadow Park
 Ridge Road
 Seventh Street
 Pike View Early Childhood Center

Former schools

 Scipio Jones High School, the segregated public school for black children, was established in 1909 and disestablished in 1970.
 Belwood (Closed)
 North Heights (Closed)
 Park Hill (Closed)
 Redwood (No longer a school)

Pre-Kindergarten schools 

 Pike View Early Childhood Center

School uniforms
All K-8 students and students at NLR Academy are required to wear school uniforms.

References

External links

 

North Little Rock, Arkansas
Education in Pulaski County, Arkansas
School districts in Arkansas